Albert Stanley Janin (1881-1931) was an American inventor of a hydro-airplane which he invented in 1907 independently of Glenn Curtiss. Even though Janin had a prior patent, he lost in prolonged patent litigations to Curtiss on the grounds that Janin's designs did not disclose sufficient detail. Janin did win his claim first but then lost it on appeals.

Janin was honored by President Woodrow Wilson for donating much of his patents to the government during World War I.
Janin was also credited with invention of the inflammable bullet used during that war, and the catapult to launch planes from ships.

References 

1881 births
1931 deaths
20th-century American inventors